Sypniewo may refer to:

Sypniewo, part of the Nowe Miasto district of Poznań
Sypniewo, Chodzież County in Greater Poland Voivodeship (west-central Poland)
Sypniewo, Złotów County in Greater Poland Voivodeship (west-central Poland)
Sypniewo, Kuyavian-Pomeranian Voivodeship (north-central Poland)
Sypniewo, Masovian Voivodeship (east-central Poland)